Stillbrew armour, or more correctly, the Stillbrew Crew Protection Package (SCPP) was an add-on passive composite armour applied to the FV4201 Chieftain main battle tank used by the British Army's Royal Armoured Corps in the mid-1980s and early-1990s so as to provide increased protection from enemy projectiles. It was named after the two men that invented it, Colonel Still and John Brewer, from the Military Vehicles and Engineering Establishment in Surrey. The tanks to which it was fitted were colloquially referred to as Stillbrew Chieftains.

Background
During the 1973 Arab-Israeli War the Israeli Defence Forces (IDF) lost many tanks, mainly to hollow charge projectiles. Among the losses were British-supplied Centurions. The Royal Armoured Corps (RAC), through organisations such as the Military Vehicles and Engineering Establishment (MVEE) and the Royal Armament Research and Development Establishment (RARDE), began conducting research into how to improve the effectiveness of the armour used in its armoured fighting vehicles (AFVs).

With the outbreak of the Iran-Iraq War in 1980, research accelerated after numerous Iranian Chieftains were destroyed or severely disabled by Iraqi T-62s, and forensic examination of captured Iranian Chieftains supplied by Iraq was undertaken. The British assessment of these vehicles concluded that the front of Chieftain's hull and turret, originally designed to provide protection against all types of ammunition from the Soviet 100mm main gun fitted the older T-55, was not adequate to protect against APFSDS and HEAT ammunition from the newer T-62's larger 115mm main gun, nor other similar current or near-future tank ammunition. Consequently, a program to up-armour the Chieftain commenced at the MVEE which resulted in the Stillbrew armour package.

Design

Stillbrew armour was a passive (i.e. non-explosive, non-reactive) appliqué armour designed to provide additional protection against HEAT ammunition and hollow and shaped charge weapons such as the RPG-7 and the AT-3 Sagger anti-tank missile by deflecting the explosive jet, as well as increased protection against ballistic and kinetic projectiles such as APFSDS ammunition through increased armour thickness.

The armour was designed as modular blocks consisting of six layers of steel plate spaced with thick rubber, which were added to the front of the turret and on the hull around the driver's position, which served to increase protection to the turret ring. The blocks were fastened to the vehicle by stainless steel bolts, and a final layer of sheet steel was welded over the block covering the bolt heads and providing a flush surface; this also provided protection from water and NBC agents from getting under the blocks and causing corrosion and contamination of the vehicle's surfaces.

When struck by a shaped charge, one or more layers of the block would shift or shear away, effectively providing a new surface the explosive jet had to penetrate, thus further deflecting or depleting the jet with every successive layer it encountered. The layers and the spacing was also found to be effective in countering HESH ammunition. When struck by a kinetic projectile, the armour blocks effectively increased the vehicle's armour path by a minimum of 50% (this figure was more than just the additional thickness of the armour block; when struck by a ballistic penetrator the kinetic energy would cause the layers - particularly the rubber layers - to expand), minimising or removing the chances of penetration of the vehicle's hull or turret. Furthermore, it was discovered that armour blocks were of sufficient strength to render medium-calibre projectile (up to 25mm conventional or 20mm tungsten AP ammunition) 100% ineffective and did not damage the blocks.

While Stillbrew armour was later found to also be effective against stopping HEAT rounds from the 125mm main gun of a T-72, it was insufficient to stop tungsten and depleted uranium APFSDS rounds from this weapon, and an additional minimum increase of 30% effectiveness of the original design would be required. However, further development was cancelled due to the emergence of the superior Chobham armour.

Operational history
Testing of the prototype armour began in 1984 with firing and mobility trials being conducted until 1985, and the design was deemed successful without any changes required. Production of the armour commenced in 1985 at the Royal Ordnance Factory Leeds and fitting began in 1986. Vehicles located in the UK were fitted with the armour package by the Royal Electrical and Mechanical Engineers (REME) in base workshops across the country, while those vehicles deployed to West Germany were fitted at 23 REME Base Workshop in Wetter in the Ruhr.

The armour was first fitted to the Mark 10 Chieftain in 1986, and was also later fitted to the Marks 11 and 12. It was also due to be fitted to the Mark 13, which was to be the final model Chieftain, but this variant was cancelled with the introduction of the Challenger 1.

Stillbrew armour was rendered obsolete by the introduction of the more effective Chobham armour, first fitted to the experimental Chieftain 800 and 900 (and which features on the Challenger 1).

No other armoured fighting vehicles nor Chieftains sold to foreign armies (including exports of the Mark 10A), were fitted with Stillbrew armour.

References

External links
 World Register of Surviving Historic Armoured Vehicles - FV4201 Chieftain Tank 

Vehicle armour
British inventions